The Sainik School, Balachadi, in Jamnagar, Gujarat, is one of the leading Sainik Schools in the chain of Sainik Schools. It is one of the outstanding boarding schools for public education in Gujarat. It was established in July 1961 by the then Honorable Minister of Home Affairs, Shri Lal Bahadur Shastri. It is an elite English medium, fully residential boarding school for boys and girls,  providing premium public education, with a military bias, up to 10+2 stage, as per the Central Board of Secondary Education.

Sainik Schools were a dream conceived by V K Krishna Menon, the then Defense Minister of India. The schools are run by the Government of India and managed by the Sainik School Society under the Government of India. The chain of Sainik Schools in India was established with the prime focus of strengthening the Armed Forces, the All India Civil Services IAS and the IPS, besides other fields of public service.

Location
The approximately  campus is flanked by the Gulf of Kutch, encompassed by a Bungalow of the then ruler of Nawanagar, Maharaja Jam Shaheb Digvijaysinhji Ranjitsinhji, the Sachana Ship Breaking Yard and a natural coastal beach.

A campsite for the children of Polish refugees of World War II was built by K. S. Digvijaysinhji, Jam Saheb Maharaja of Nawanagar in 1942, near his summer resort. He gave refuge to hundreds of Polish children rescued from Polish and Soviet camps. The campsite is now a part of the Sainik School, Balachadi.

Activities
Outdoor games:
 football
 basketball
 hockey
 volleyball
 cricket
 badminton
 tennis
 squash
 Athletic competitions (track and field)
Inter house competitions in all these events are organized.

Clubs:
 art club
 craft club
 story–telling club
 physics club
 chemistry club
 bio club
 bird watching club
 computer club
 trekking club.

Inter-school competitions participated in:
 debates
 declamation
 quiz competitions
 essay writing
 poetry
 short story writing
 drawing
 painting
 all sports and games.

The school sends a large number of cadets to attend camps (NCC and others) organized around the country.

The Literary Club English and Hindi organizes inter-house competitions in:
 declamation
 debate
 essay writing
 poetry
 recitation
 spelling

Other activities:
 science quiz
 general quiz
 weekly news analysis
 group discussions

Tours:
 Defense tours:
 National Defence Academy
 Indian Military Academy
 Defense establishments in:
 Mumbai
 Cochin
 Bangalore
 Madras
 and Hyderabad
 Educational tours to historical places:
 Dwarika
 Somnath
 Mumbai
 Cycling expeditions
 Trekking expeditions

School Routine
The day starts with morning parade under the guidance of physical training instructors from the Army Physical Training Corps/ NCC Instructors. This is followed by a bath, change of clothes and breakfast. Classes begin at 08.30 am and run up to 1.30 pm, with two short intervals, in the first of which, the cadets are given light refreshments, served centrally. After the classes, they go for lunch. The time between 1400 hrs. and 1700 hrs. is used for academically weak students to go for their remedial classes, while others do homework, engage in club activities, pursue hobbies, ready their kit, or do gardening. There are outdoor evening games from 1700 hrs. to 1800 hrs. Evening prep. gives the cadets sufficient time to do their homework and clear their doubts. Dinner is at 2030 hrs.

National Cadet Corps
All the boys are enrolled into the National Cadet Corps and follow a combined syllabus of the three services (Army, Navy and Air Force). The school possesses a full-fledged NCC company.

Admission
Selections comprise two parts: the written exam and the medical examination, with an interview. The candidates who qualify in the written examinations are called for medical examination and interview.

References

External links
 Official website of Sainik School, Balachadi

Sainik schools
Educational institutions established in 1961
Jamnagar district
1961 establishments in Gujarat
Boarding schools in Gujarat
Polish refugees
Polish expatriates in India
Refugee camps in India